Nitu Ghanghas (born 19 October 2000) is an Indian boxer who is a two-time world youth champion in light flyweight. She won the gold medal at the 2022 Commonwealth Games in the minimumweight category.

References

External links
 

2000 births
Living people
Indian women boxers
Light-flyweight boxers
People from Bhiwani district
Boxers from Haryana
Sportswomen from Haryana
Boxers at the 2022 Commonwealth Games
Commonwealth Games gold medallists for India
Commonwealth Games medallists in boxing
21st-century Indian women
Medallists at the 2022 Commonwealth Games